Franz Anton von Harrach zu Rorau (born 2 October 1665, Vienna – 18 July 1727, Salzburg) was appointed coadjutor of Vienna and Titular Bishop of Epiphania in Syria in 1701, was from 1702 to 1705 Prince-Bishop of Vienna, 1705 coadjutor of Salzburg, and ruled from 1709 to 1727 as one of the most important Prince-Archbishops of Salzburg.

Biography

Early life
Franz Anton was a son of Ferdinand Bonaventure Graf von Harrach (1637-1706), confidant of Emperor Leopold I, and Johanna Theresa Gräfin von Lamberg. His younger brothers were Aloys Thomas Raimund von Harrach (1669-1742), the progenitor of the house, and Johann Philipp von Harrach, a Fieldmarshal. 
Franz Anton grew up in Madrid, studied canon and civil law at the Pontificium Collegium Germanicum et Hungaricum de Urbe in Rome, and was raised by Emperor Leopold ad personam in the Imperial princely state.

Ecclesiastical career
In 1685, Franz Anton was canon in Passau, 1687 canon in Salzburg, and 1692 there dean. Emperor Leopold I appointed him coadjutor of Vienna in July 1701, the Papal confirmation taking place on 1 December. He was also Titular Bishop of Epiphania. When Prince-Bishop Ernest Graf von Trautson died on 7 January 1702, Harrach became his successor and received the episcopal ordination by Johann Philipp von Lamberg, Prince-Bishop of Passau. On 19 October 1705, he was appointed coadjutor of the Prince-Archbishop of Salzburg, Johann Ernst von Thun und Hohenstein, and confirmed in April 1706 by the Pope. After the death of Thun, he was on 29 May 1709 made reigning Prince-Archbishop of Salzburg.

Franz Anton was benevolent, affable and popular as prince-bishop, he loved pageantry and had the Mirabell Palace considerably enlarged and renewed. The result was an impressive Rococo staircase and marble hall. From 1710 to 1711, he had the Salzburg residence renewed. His reign was calm overall, even contemporaries spoke of the "Golden Age of Harrach". His artistic sense, which was characterized by the Late Baroque, is especially praised. He employed well-known artists for the execution of the plans at great cost. The architects were Johann Bernhard Fischer von Erlach and Johann Lucas von Hildebrandt, sculptor Georg Raphael Donner, painters  Johann Michael Rottmayr and Martino Altomonte.

Prince-Bishop Harrach endeavored to promote business and commerce as a source of prosperity. For trading in Venice and the Mediterranean, he had the major trade routes extended. He lies buried in the crypt of Salzburg Cathedral.

Bibliography
 Christoph Brandhuber: Recreatio principis. Fürsterzbischof Franz Anton Fürst von Harrach und seine „Retirade“ In: Vision und Realität. Die Salzburger Residenz 1587–1727 Österreichische Zeitschrift für Kunst und Denkmalpflege [ÖZKD] LXIII, 2009, Heft 1/2. Horn/Wien 2009, S. 118–125.
 Christoph Brandhuber, Werner Rainer: Ein Fürst führt Tagebuch. Die „Notata“ des Salzburger Fürsterzbischofs Franz Anton Fürsten von Harrach (1665-1727). In: Salzburg Archiv 34 (2010), S. 205–262.
 Franz Loidl: Geschichte des Erzbistums Wien. Herold, Wien 1983. .
 Ernst Tomek: Kirchengeschichte Österreichs. Tyrolia, Innsbruck – Wien – München 1935–1959.
 Imma Walderdorff: Zu den Gemäldegalerien in der Residenz unter Fürsterzbischof Franz Anton Fürst von Harrach. In: Vision und Realität. Die Salzburger Residenz 1587–1727 Österreichische Zeitschrift für Kunst und Denkmalpflege [ÖZKD] LXIII, 2009, Heft 1/2. Horn/Wien 2009, S. 139–153.
 Imma Walderdorff, Roswitha Juffinger: Rekonstruktion der Bilder-Hängung eines Wandabschnitts der „Schönen Galerie“ In: Vision und Realität. Die Salzburger Residenz 1587–1727 Österreichische Zeitschrift für Kunst und Denkmalpflege [ÖZKD] LXIII, 2009, Heft 1/2. Horn/Wien 2009, S. 154–156.
 Josef Wodka: Kirche in Österreich. Wegweiser durch ihre Geschichte. Herder, Wien 1959.

External links
  
 
 Salzburg Coins (Biografie) 
 Stammbaum Leonhard IV von Harrach zu Rohrau  C11 - D1 - E3

1665 births
1727 deaths
Roman Catholic archbishops of Salzburg
Collegium Germanicum et Hungaricum alumni
Bishops of Vienna
18th-century Roman Catholic bishops in Austria
Franz Anton
Nobility from Vienna
Prince-archbishops of Salzburg